Hannington Kalyesubula (born January 28, 1982) is a Ugandan footballer, who currently plays for Rwenshama FC in the Ugandan Super League.

Career 
He began his career by Villa SC in the Ugandan Premier League, later move to Police Jinja, before in 2006 transferred to Saint-George SA in the Ethiopian Premier League. After two years in Ethiopia, SC Villa signed him on December 14, 2008  on a two-year contract., before moved on August 4, 2010 to Tanzania premier league outfit Kagera Sugar.

International career 
The goalkeeper was a member of the Uganda.

Notes

1982 births
Ugandan footballers
Living people
Ugandan expatriate sportspeople in Tanzania
Association football goalkeepers
Expatriate footballers in Ethiopia
Uganda international footballers
Expatriate footballers in Tanzania
Ugandan expatriate footballers
SC Villa players
Ugandan expatriate sportspeople in Ethiopia